Katia Overfeldt (born 14 March 1968) is a former synchronized swimmer from Belgium.

References

External links 
Profile on olympics.com
Profile on fina.org
Profile on olympedia.org

1968 births
Living people
Belgian synchronized swimmers
Olympic synchronized swimmers of Belgium
Synchronized swimmers at the 1984 Summer Olympics
Sportspeople from Kortrijk